The Holocaust in East Upper Silesia resulted in the murder of most of the Jews living in East Upper Silesia during World War II. It is best known as the site of Auschwitz concentration camp, but it also hosted many of the forced-labor camps of Organization Schmelt and seventeen ghettos, including Sosnowiec Ghetto, Będzin Ghetto, and Dąbrowa Górnicza  Ghetto. Part of the region had been in Poland before World War II and other parts in Germany.

References

External links

The Holocaust by region
The Holocaust in Germany
The Holocaust in Poland
History of Silesia